The 475th Air Base Wing is an inactive United States Air Force unit.   Its last duty station was at Yokota Air Base, Japan, where it was inactivated on 1 April 1992.

A non-flying wing, the wing's mission at Yokota was to perform host unit missions.  The wing had no numbered flying squadrons, although it did operate a few T-39 Sabreliner aircraft and UH-1 Huey helicopters.  It was absorbed by the 374th Airlift Wing under the "one base-one wing" organizational concept.

History
 See: 475th Fighter Group for complete history and lineage information
The 475th Fighter Wing was activated in 1948 as part of the "Base-Wing" USAF reorganization, assigned to the 315th Air Division of Far East Air Forces where it performed postwar occupation duty. The wing was one of several occupation units in Japan, and was inactivated on 1 April 1949 at Ashiya Airfield due to budget reductions.

Cold War
In January 1968, the 475th Tactical Fighter Wing was activated at Misawa Air Base, Japan, replacing the 39th Air Division as the host unit, with the 439th Combat Support Group being replaced by the 475th Combat Support Group that controlled the base support units.  At Misawa, the wing trained for offensive and reconnaissance operations.  Initial assigned operational squadrons of the wing were:

 67th Tactical Fighter Squadron (15 January 1968 – 15 March 1971) (F-4D) (UP)
 356th Tactical Fighter Squadron (15 January 1968 – 15 March 1971) (F-4D) (UK)
 391st Tactical Fighter Squadron (22 July 1968 – 28 February 1971) (F-4D) (UD)
 421st Tactical Fighter Squadron (Attached) (23 April 1969 – 25 Jun 1969) (F-4E) (LC)
 45th Tactical Reconnaissance Squadron* (15 January 1968 – 15 March 1971) (RF-101C)
 612th Tactical Fighter Squadron* (15 January 1968 – 15 March 1971) (F-100D)

The 45th TRS and 612th TFS were unmanned during their entire assignment, as squadron was on deployed status to bases in South Vietnam (The 45th TRS deployed to Tan Son Nhut Air Base; the 612th TFS at Phù Cát Air Base).

From Misawa, aircraft and personnel of the 67th, 356th and 391st TFS rotated six aircraft every ten days to Kusan and Taegu Air Bases in South Korea performing Nuclear alert duty.  On 16 May 1968, the M8.3 Tokachi earthquake caused over $1 million worth of damage to Misawa AB. Air Force fighter operations ceased at Misawa in early 1971, and the wing phased down operations.  All flying resources were reassigned to Kusan AB South Korea for the 3d Tactical Fighter Wing, and the wing was inactivated on 15 March, being replaced by the 6112th Air Base Group as Misawa was phased down for reconstruction.

After a brief period of inactivation, the 475th Air Base Wing was reactivated on 1 November 1971 at Yokota Air Base, Japan, replacing the 6100th Air Base Wing. At Yokota, the wing inherited a huge support complex, with some 47 sub-locations in all parts of Japan, including operation of Yokota and Tachikawa Air Bases, Fuchu and Chitose Air Stations, and numerous housing complexes within the Tokyo area. In 1972 the wing's components were as below:

 HQ 475th Air Base Wing (Yokota AB)
 556th Reconnaissance Squadron
 475th Consolidated Aircraft Maintenance Squadron
 475th Supply Squadron
 475th Security Police Squadron
 475th Transportation Squadron
 475th Civil Engineering Squadron
 475th Services Squadron
 34th Air Base Squadron (Grant Heights, Nerima, Tokyo)
 37th Air Base Squadron (Fuchu AS, Fuchu, Tokyo)
 331st Air Base Squadron (Johnson FHA)
 475th Air Base Squadron (Tachikawa AB)
 USAF Hospital, Tachikawa
 6120th Broadcasting Squadron (South Camp Drake, Asaka, Saitama)
 6123d Air Base Squadron (Chitose AS)
 USAF Hospital, Chitose
 OL-AA, 475th Air Base Wing (Shingu Wells, Hakata, Fukuoka)
 USAF Hospital, Shingu Wells
 OL-AB, 475th Air Base Wing (Misawa AB)
 USAF Hospital, Misawa

At Yokota, the only operational flying squadron was the 556th Reconnaissance Squadron (formerly assigned to the 347th Tactical Fighter Wing at Yokota from 1968). The 556th RS was a highly specialized unit, employing modified C-130B-II, EB-57E electronic counter measures (ECM) aircraft and on occasion TDY C-130A-II and EC-97G Stratotankers. Only the EB-57E's carried the tail code GT, the C-130B-IIs and other aircraft being uncoded.

Post Vietnam era
The 55th RS was inactivated on 30 June 1972, after which the 475th supported a Royal Thai Air Force C-123 Provider detachment which provided airlift support to the United Nations Command (Rear) of Fifth Air Force, which relocated its headquarters to Yokota in November 1974.

The 475th ABW also gradually closed down many of its widely dispersed installations, sites and facilities, consolidating them as well as assisting in the closing of Tachikawa Air Base in September 1977.  On 1 October 1978, Military Airlift Command (MAC) established the 316th Tactical Airlift Group at Yokota, being supported by the 475th ABW. This was MAC's operational support airlift group in the Far East, with the 1403d Military Airlift Squadron flying a combination of CT-39As, C-12Fs, and C-21As which it obtained from various bases in PACAF, consolidating them at Yokota. On 1 October 1989, this unit was upgraded to a wing level and personnel redesignated as the 374th Tactical Airlift Wing, which was moved from Clark AB, Philippines in a name-only redesignation.

The 475th ABW was inactivated on 1 April 1992 as part of a consolidation effort, being replaced as host unit at Yokota by the 374th, which was redesignated 374th Airlift Wing same date.

Lineage
 Established as 475th Fighter Wing on 10 August 1948
 Activated on 18 August 1948
 Inactivated 1 April 1949
 Redesignated 475th Tactical Fighter Wing and activated on 21 December 1967 (not organized)
 Organized on 15 January 1968
 Inactivated 15 March 1971
 Redesignated 475th Air Base Wing on 20 October 1971
 Activated 1 November 1971
 Inactivated 1 April 1992, personnel and equipment consolidated into 374th Airlift Wing

Assignments
 315th Air Division, 18 Aug 1948 – 1 Apr 1949
 Pacific Air Forces, 21 December 1967 (not organized)
 Fifth Air Force, 15 Jan 1968 – 15 Mar 1971
 Fifth Air Force, 1 Nov 1971 – 1 Apr 1992

Components
Group
 475th Fighter Group: 18 Aug 1948 – 1 Apr 1949

Squadrons
 16th Tactical Reconnaissance Squadron: 16 Mar 1970 – 15 Feb 1971, attached 16–22 Feb 1971.
 45th Tactical Reconnaissance Squadron: 15 Jan 1968 – 15 Mar 1971 (not operational).
 67th Tactical Fighter Squadron: 15 Jan 1968 – 15 Mar 1971
 356th Tactical Fighter Squadron: 15 Jan 1968 – 15 Mar 1971
 391st Tactical Fighter Squadron: 22 Jul 1968 – 28 Feb 1971
 421st Tactical Fighter Squadron: attached 23 Apr-25 Jun 1969
 556th Reconnaissance Squadron: 1 Nov 1971 – 30 Jun 1972
 612th Tactical Fighter Squadron: 15 Jan 1968 – 15 Mar 1971 (not operational).

Stations
 Itazuke Airfield, Japan, 28 August 1948
 Ashiya Airfield, Japan, 25 March – 1 April 1949
 Misawa AB, Japan 15 January 1968 – 15 March 1971
 Yokota AB, Japan, 1 November 1971 – 1 April 1992

Aircraft
 F-51 Mustang, 1948–1949
 F-100 Super Sabre, 1968
 F-4D Phantom II, 1968–1971
 RF-4C Phantom II, 1970–1971
 C-130 Hercules, 1971–1972
 C-123 Provider, 1971–1976

References
 Notes

 Citations

Bibliography

 * Martin, Patrick. Tail Code: The Complete History of USAF Tactical Aircraft Tail Code Markings. Schiffer Military Aviation History, 1994. .

External links
 USAAS-USAAC-USAAF-USAF Aircraft Serial Numbers—1908 to present
 Headless Fighters: USAF Reconnaissance-UAVs over Vietnam

0475
Military units and formations established in 1971